The 1991 British National Track Championships were a series of track cycling competitions held from 26 July – 3 August 1991 at the Leicester Velodrome.

Medal summary

Men's Events

Women's Events

References

1991 in British sport
July 1991 sports events in the United Kingdom
August 1991 sports events in the United Kingdom